Lin Ming-cheng (born on 3 January 1943, Itabashi Town, Kaizan District, Taihoku Prefecture, Japanese Taiwan (modern-day Banqiao District)) is a Taiwanese banker who is a member of the seventh generation of Lin family from Banciao, one of the richest families of Taiwan. He is the only son of Lin Hsiung-cheng and a grandson of Lin Erh-kang. In June 2008, Forbes magazine ranked him as the 20th-richest person in Taiwan. He is serving as the vice chairman of Hua Nan Financial Holdings, and the director of Hua Nan Bank of China.

References

Taiwanese bankers
Ming-cheng
Taiwanese billionaires
Taiwanese people of Hoklo descent
Taiwanese people of Japanese descent
Living people
1943 births
National Chengchi University alumni
Keio University alumni
Businesspeople from New Taipei